The 1911 Arkansas Razorbacks football team represented the University of Arkansas during the 1911 college football season. In their fourth year under head coach Hugo Bezdek, the Razorbacks compiled a 6–2–1 record, shut out five of nine opponents, and outscored all opponents by a combined total of 268 to 23. The team's 100–0 victory over S.W. Missouri St. remains the highest single-game point total in Arkansas history.

Schedule

References

Arkansas
Arkansas Razorbacks football seasons
Arkansas Razorbacks football